Inminban (meaning "neighbourhood units" or "people's units") is a Neighbourhood Watch-like form of cooperative local organization in North Korea. No North Korean person exists outside the inminban system; everyone is a member.

History
The inminban network was established by the late 1960s. Every North Korean woman who does not have a full-time job is required to participate in inminban activities, which include cleaning public toilets, tidying up the neighbourhood, manufacturing small items at home, and occasionally going to the countryside to do agricultural work. This made women without jobs nearly as busy as those with jobs, and was said to contribute to high female participation in the North Korea workforce. In the late 1960s employed North Korean women received a  ration of rice daily, where women who participated in inminban instead of having a job received just . Since the 1990s, the effectiveness of the inminban network has weakened.

Structure
A typical inminban consists of 25 to 50 families and is defined by residential proximity. For example, an inminban might consist of all families sharing a common staircase in a large apartment building. Each inminban is headed by an official, usually a middle-aged woman, known as inminbanjang (people's unit head). She will ordinarily receive a small stipend from the state for her work, as well as additional food rations.

The inminban system is not formally part of the North Korean security apparatus, but supports it. All inminban members are responsible for monitoring each other for criminal activity or political disobedience. The inminbanjang meets regularly with party authorities, and reports misbehaviour to them. The local district office people's committee (洞事務所人民委員會) oversees her work and passes down to her directives from the Workers' Party of Korea.

Some scholars say that the North Korean economic crisis and subsequent famine of the 1990s has left North Korea unable to compensate functionaries such as inminbanjang, reducing their incentive to help the state maintain social control. Inminbanjang are said to still be an important support to the North Korean security apparatus, but perhaps less motivated and diligent than they used to be.

In addition to surveillance, the inminban engages in managing neighborhoods by, for instance, taking care of garbage and sewage which can be an additional point of income.

See also

Mass surveillance in North Korea
Committees for the Defense of the Revolution (Cuba)
Committees for the Defense of the Revolution (Burkina Faso)
Blockleiter (Nazi Germany)
Informal collaborator (East Germany)
Voluntary People's Druzhina (Soviet Union)
Tonarigumi (WWII-era Japan)
Work unit

References

Works cited

External links
Photos of inminban noticeboards at an apartment, Yle 

Politics of North Korea
Law enforcement in North Korea
Neighborhood watch organizations